Blue Friend may refer to:

 Blue Friend (RahXephon), an episode of RahXephon
 Blue Friend (manga), a 2011 yuri manga